Peralam is a panchayat town in Thiruvarur district in the Indian state of Tamil Nadu.

Demographics
 India census, Peralam had a population of 5,844. Males constitute 50% of the population and females 50%. Peralam has an average literacy rate of 80%, higher than the national average of 59.5%: male literacy is 84%, and female literacy is 77%. In Peralam, 10% of the population is under 6 years of age.

References

Cities and towns in Tiruvarur district